The Ridin' Streak is a 1925 American silent Western film directed by Del Andrews and starring Bob Custer, Roy Laidlaw, and Frank Brownlee.

Plot
As described in a film magazine review, the young sheriff of a Western town saves a young woman’s fortune from falling into the hands of a scheming scoundrel and later saves her from the importunities of a fortune hunter. Through a clever ruse, he wins a $5,000 purse after defeating the hirelings the villain has bribed to prevent his success. The culmination of his romance with the young woman takes the form of wedding preparations.

Cast

References

Bibliography
 Connelly, Robert B. The Silents: Silent Feature Films, 1910-36, Volume 40, Issue 2. December Press, 1998.
 Munden, Kenneth White. The American Film Institute Catalog of Motion Pictures Produced in the United States, Part 1. University of California Press, 1997.

External links
 

1925 films
1925 Western (genre) films
American silent feature films
Silent American Western (genre) films
American black-and-white films
Films directed by Del Andrews
Film Booking Offices of America films
1920s English-language films
1920s American films